Günter Kuhnke (7 September 1912 – 11 October 1990) was a German submarine commander during World War II and later a Konteradmiral with the Bundesmarine, West Germany's navy. He was a recipient of the Knight's Cross of the Iron Cross of Nazi Germany.

Career
He commanded 10th U-boat Flotilla from January 1942 until October 1944, then 33rd U-boat Flotilla until May 1945.

Kuhnke joined Bundesmarine in 1955. commanded the destroyer Z-2 (D171) (formerly USS Ringgold (DD-500)) from 14 July 1959 until 15 November 1960. In 1966, he was promoted to Konteradmiral (rear admiral) in 1966. Kuhnke retired from service in September 1972.

Awards
 Wehrmacht Long Service Award, 4th class (2 October 1936)
 Iron Cross (1939)
 2nd Class (29 September 1939)
 1st Class (1 October 1939)
 War Merit Cross 2nd Class with Swords (30 January 1944)
 Knight's Cross of the Iron Cross on 19 September 1940 as Kapitänleutnant and commander of U-28
 Grand Cross of Merit of the Federal Republic of Germany (26 June 1969)
 Grand Merit Cross with Star of the Federal Republic of Germany (30 September 1972)

References

Citations

Bibliography

 
 
 

1912 births
1990 deaths
People from Elbląg
People from West Prussia
U-boat commanders (Kriegsmarine)
Knights Commander of the Order of Merit of the Federal Republic of Germany
Recipients of the Knight's Cross of the Iron Cross
Bundesmarine admirals
Counter admirals of the German Navy